Dirty Money is a British game show that aired on Sky One from 15 April to 24 May 2002 and was hosted by Marcus Bentley.

Format
The six contestants were each given £500 to start the game. They participated in five rounds of 90 seconds duration each, and had to buzz in to answer questions read by the narrator. A correct answer entitled them to "steal" £50 from another player, but an incorrect answer forced them to give £50 to another player. In either case, they'll choose the player. For the fifth round, the amount was doubled to £100.

At the end of each round, the person with the least money was eliminated, and had to give all their money to another player. After the fourth round, however, the eliminated player could split the money between the two remaining players in whatever proportion they desired (although presumably had to keep it in multiples of £50).

When only one player remained, they then had to answer six questions correctly in 75 seconds to keep the £3,000 they had won. Failing to get six questions right meant that the £3,000 had to be given to one of the previously eliminated players.

References

External links
.

2000s British game shows
2002 British television series debuts
2002 British television series endings
Sky UK original programming
Television series by ITV Studios